MV St Cecilia is a vehicle and passenger ferry formerly operated by Wightlink on its route from Portsmouth to Fishbourne on the Isle of Wight, the route she took throughout her life.

St Cecilia was built in Yorkshire and was launched into the River Ouse. In March 1987, she began carrying passengers. In 2001 she appeared as a fictional "Norselink" ferry in a Gérard Depardieu film.

Her final voyage for Wightlink was on 25 January 2019, after which she joined her two older sisterships Anna Mur and GB Conte in Sardinia. She now operates linking Carloforte and Calasetta with the name Nando Murrau, operated by Delcomar.

References

External links

 Delcomar website
 Wightlink website

Ferry transport on the Isle of Wight
Ferries of England
Ships built in Selby
1986 ships